This is a list of schools in Kent, England.

State-funded schools

Primary schools

Adisham CE Primary School, Adisham
Aldington Primary School, Aldington
All Souls' CE Primary School, Folkestone
Allington Primary School, Maidstone
Amherst School, Riverhead
The Anthony Roper Primary School, Eynsford
Archbishop Courtenay Primary School, Tovil
Ash Cartwright and Kelsey CE Primary School, Ash
Ashford Oaks Community Primary School, Ashford
Ashford St Mary's CE Primary School, Ashford
Aycliffe Community Primary School, Dover
Aylesham Primary School, Aylesham
Bapchild and Tonge CE Primary School, Bapchild
Barham CE Primary School, Barham
Barming Primary School, Barming
Barton Junior School, Dover
Bean Primary School, Bean
Bearsted Primary Academy, Weavering
Beaver Green Primary School, Ashford
Benenden CE Primary School, Benenden
Bethersden Primary School, Bethersden
Bidborough CE Primary School, Bidborough
Birchington CE Primary School, Birchington-on-Sea
Bishop Chavasse Primary School, Tonbridge
Bishops Down Primary School, Royal Tunbridge Wells
Blean Primary School, Blean
Bobbing Village School, Bobbing
Bodsham CE Primary School, Bodsham
Borden CE Primary School, Borden
Borough Green Primary School, Borough Green
Boughton Monchelsea Primary School, Boughton Monchelsea
Boughton-under-Blean and Dunkirk Primary School, Boughton under Blean
Brabourne CE Primary School, Brabourne
Bredgar CE Primary School, Bredgar
Bredhurst CE Primary School, Bredhurst
Brenchley and Matfield CE Primary School, Brenchley
The Brent Primary School, Stone
Brenzett CE Primary School, Brenzett
Briary Primary School, Herne Bay
Bridge and Patrixbourne CE Primary School, Bridge
Broadwater Down Primary School, Royal Tunbridge Wells
Bromstone Primary School, Broadstairs
Brook Community Primary School, Brook
Brookfield Infant School, Larkfield
Brookfield Junior School, Larkfield
Brookland CE Primary School, Brookland
Brunswick House Primary School, Maidstone
Burham CE Primary School, Burham
Bysing Wood Primary School, Faversham
Cage Green Primary School, Tonbridge
Callis Grange Nursery and Infant School, Broadstairs
The Canterbury Primary School, Canterbury
Canterbury Road Primary School, Sittingbourne
Capel Primary School, Five Oak Green
Capel-le-Ferne Primary School, Capel-le-Ferne
Castle Hill Community Primary School, Folkestone
Cecil Road Primary and Nursery School, Northfleet
Challock Primary School, Challock
Chantry Community Academy, Gravesend
Charing Primary School, Charing
Charlton CE Primary School, Dover
Chartham Primary School, Chartham
Cheriton Primary School, Folkestone
Cherry Orchard Primary Academy, Ebbsfleet Valley
Chevening St Botolph's CE Primary School, Chipstead
Chiddingstone CE School, Chiddingstone
Chilham St Mary's CE Primary School, Chilham
Chilmington Green Primary School, Chilmington Green
Chilton Primary School, Ramsgate
Chislet CE Primary School, Chislet
Christ Church CE Junior School, Ramsgate
Christ Church CE Primary Academy, Folkestone
Churchill CE Primary School, Westerham
The Churchill School, Hawkinge
Claremont Primary School, Royal Tunbridge Wells
Cliftonville Primary School, Cliftonville
Cobham Primary School, Cobham
Colliers Green CE Primary School, Colliers Green
Copperfield Academy, Northfleet
Coxheath Primary School, Coxheath
Cranbrook CE Primary School, Cranbrook
The Craylands School, Swanscombe
Crockenhill Primary School, Crockenhill
Crockham Hill CE Primary School, Crockham Hill
Culverstone Green Primary School, Meopham
Dame Janet Primary Academy, Ramsgate
Dartford Bridge Community Primary School, Dartford
Dartford Primary Academy, Dartford
Davington Primary School, Davington
Deal Parochial CE Primary School, Deal
The Discovery School, Kings Hill
Ditton CE Junior School, Ditton
Ditton Infant School, Ditton
Doddington Primary School, Doddington
Dover St Mary's CE Primary School, Dover
The Downs CE Primary School, Walmer
Downs View Infant School, Kennington
Downsview Community Primary School, Swanley
Drapers Mills Primary Academy, Margate
Dunton Green Primary School, Dunton Green
Dymchurch Primary School, Dymchurch
East Farleigh Primary School, East Farleigh
East Peckham Primary School, East Peckham
East Stour Primary School, Willesborough
Eastchurch CE Primary School, Eastchurch
Eastling Primary School, Eastling
Eastry CE Primary School, Eastry
Ebbsfleet Green Primary School, Ebbsfleet Valley
Edenbridge Primary School, Edenbridge
Egerton CE Primary School, Egerton
Elham CE Primary School, Elham
Ellington Infant School, Ramsgate
Ethelbert Road Primary School, Faversham
Eythorne Elvington Primary School, Eythorne
Fawkham CE Primary School, Fawkham
Finberry Primary School, Finberry
Fleetdown Primary Academy, Darenth
Folkestone Primary, Folkestone
Folkestone St Martin's CE Primary School, Folkestone
Folkestone St Mary's CE Primary Academy, Folkestone
Folkestone St Peter's CE Primary School, Folkestone
Fordcombe CE Primary School, Fordcombe
Four Elms Primary School, Four Elms
Frittenden CE Primary School, Frittenden
Furley Park Primary School, Kingsnorth
Garlinge Primary School, Margate
The Gateway Primary Academy, Dartford
Goat Lees Primary School, Kennington
Godinton Primary School, Ashford
Goodnestone CE Primary School, Goodnestone
Goudhurst and Kilndown CE Primary School, Goudhurst
Graveney Primary School, Graveney
Great Chart Primary School, Great Chart
Greatstone Primary School, Greatstone-on-Sea
Green Park Community Primary School, Buckland
Greenfields Community Primary School, Shepway
Greenlands Primary School, Darenth
Grove Park Primary School, Sittingbourne
Guston CE Primary School, Guston
Hadlow Primary School, Hadlow
Halfway Houses Primary School, Halfway Houses
Halstead Community Primary School, Halstead
Hampton Primary School, Herne Bay
Hamstreet Primary Academy, Hamstreet
Harcourt Primary School, Folkestone
Harrietsham CE Primary School, Harrietsham
Hartley Primary Academy, Hartley
Hartlip CE Primary School, Hartlip
Hawkhurst CE Primary School, Hawkhurst
Hawkinge Primary School, Hawkinge
Headcorn Primary School, Ashford
Herne Bay Infant School, Herne Bay
Herne Bay Junior School, Herne Bay
Herne CE Infant School, Herne Bay
Herne CE Junior School, Herne Bay
Hernhill CE Primary School, Hernhill
Hever CE Primary School, Hever
Hextable Primary School, Hextable
High Firs Primary School, Swanley
High Halden CE Primary School, High Halden
Higham Primary School, Higham
Hildenborough CE Primary School, Hildenborough
Hoath Primary School, Hoath
Hollingbourne Primary School, Hollingbourne
The Holy Family RC Primary School, Park Wood
Holy Trinity CE Primary School, Dartford
Holy Trinity CE Primary School, Gravesend
Holywell Primary School, Upchurch
Horizon Primary Academy, Swanley
Hornbeam Primary School, Deal
Horsmonden Primary Academy, Horsmonden
Horton Kirby CE Primary School, Horton Kirby
Hunton CE Primary School, Hunton
Hythe Bay CE Primary School, Hythe
Ide Hill CE Primary School, Ide Hill
Ightham Primary School, Ightham
Istead Rise Primary School, Northfleet
Iwade School, Iwade
John Mayne CE Primary School, Biddenden
John Wallis Academy, Ashford
The John Wesley CE/Methodist Primary School, Singleton
Joy Lane Primary School, Whitstable
Joydens Wood Infant School, Wilmington
Joydens Wood Junior School, Wilmington
Jubilee Primary School, Maidstone
Kemsing Primary School, Kemsing
Kemsley Primary Academy, Kemsley
Kennington CE Academy, Kennington
Kings Farm Primary School, Gravesend
Kings Hill Primary School, Kings Hill
Kingsdown and Ringwould CE Primary School, Kingsdown
Kingsnorth CE Primary School, Kingsnorth
Kingswood Primary School, Kingswood
Knockhall Primary School, Greenhithe
Laddingford St Mary's CE Primary School, Laddingford
Lady Boswell's CE Primary School, Sevenoaks
Lady Joanna Thornhill Endowed Primary School, Wye
Lamberhurst St Mary's CE Primary School, Lamberhurst
Langafel CE Primary School, Longfield
Langdon Primary School, East Langdon
Langley Park Primary Academy, Maidstone
Langton Green Primary School, Langton Green
Lansdowne Primary School, Sittingbourne
Lawn Primary School, Northfleet
Leeds and Broomfield CE Primary School, Leeds
Leigh Primary School, Leigh
Lenham Primary School, Lenham
Leybourne St Peter and St Paul CE Primary Academy, Leybourne
Littlebourne CE Primary School, Littlebourne
Long Mead Community Primary School, Tonbridge
Loose Primary School, Maidstone
Lower Halstow Primary School, Lower Halstow
Luddenham School, Luddenham
Lunsford Primary School, Larkfield
Lydd Primary School, Lydd
Lydden Primary School, Lydden
Lyminge CE Primary School, Lyminge
Lympne CE Primary School, Lympne
Lynsted and Norton Primary School, Lynsted
Madginford Primary School, Bearsted
Maidstone St John's CE Primary School, Grove Green
Maidstone St Michael's CE Junior School, Maidstone
Manor Community Primary School, Swanscombe
Marden Primary Academy, Marden
Margate Holy Trinity and St John's CE Primary School, Margate
Martello Primary, Folkestone
Maypole Primary School, Dartford
Meopham Community Academy, Meopham
Mereworth Community Primary School, Mereworth
Mersham Primary School, Mersham
Milstead and Frinsted CE Primary School, Milstead
Milton Court Primary Academy, Milton Regis
Minster CE Primary School, Minster-in-Thanet
Minster-in-Sheppey Primary School, Minster
Minterne Junior School, Sittingbourne
Molehill Primary Academy, Maidstone
Monkton CE Primary School, Monkton
More Park RC Primary School, West Malling
Morehall Primary School, Folkestone
Mundella Primary School, Folkestone
New Ash Green Primary School, New Ash Green
Newington CE Primary School, Newington
Newington Community Primary School, Ramsgate
Newlands Primary School, Ramsgate
Nonington CE Primary School, Nonington
North Borough Junior School, Maidstone
Northbourne CE Primary School, Northbourne
Northdown Primary School, Margate
Oakfield Primary Academy, Dartford
The Oaks Infant School, Sittingbourne
Oaks Primary Academy, Maidstone
Offham Primary School, Offham
Ospringe CE Primary School, Ospringe
Otford Primary School, Otford
Our Lady of Hartley RC Primary School, Hartley
Our Lady's RC Primary School, Dartford
Paddock Wood Primary Academy, Paddock Wood
Painters Ash Primary School, Northfleet
Palace Wood Primary School, Allington
Palm Bay Primary School, Cliftonville
Palmarsh Primary School, Palmarsh
Park Way Primary School, Maidstone
Parkside Community Primary School, Canterbury
Pembury School, Pembury
Penshurst CE Primary School, Penshurst
Petham Primary School, Petham
Phoenix Community Primary School, Kennington
Pilgrims' Way Primary School, Canterbury
Platt CE Primary School, St Mary's Platt
Platts Heath Primary School, Platts Heath
Plaxtol Primary School, Plaxtol
Pluckley CE Primary School, Pluckley
Preston Primary School, Preston
Priory Fields School, Dover
Priory Infant School, Ramsgate
Queenborough School, Queenborough
Ramsgate Arts Primary School, Ramsgate
Ramsgate Holy Trinity CE Primary School, Broadstairs
Reculver CE Primary School, Reculver
Regis Manor Primary School, Milton Regis
Repton Manor Primary School, Ashford
Richmond Academy, Sheerness
River Mill Primary School, Dartford
River Primary School, River
Riverhead Infants' School, Riverhead
Riverview Infant School, Gravesend
Riverview Junior School, Gravesend
Rodmersham School, Rodmersham Green
Rolvenden Primary School, Rolvenden
Rose Street Primary School, Sheerness
Roseacre Junior School, Bearsted
Rosherville CE Academy, Northfleet
Royal Rise Primary School, Tonbridge
Rusthall St Paul's CE Primary School, Rusthall
Ryarsh Primary School, Ryarsh
St Alphege CE Primary School, Whitstable
St Anselm's RC Primary School, Temple Hill
St Augustine's RC Primary School, Hythe
St Augustine's RC Primary School, Royal Tunbridge Wells
St Barnabas CE Primary School, Royal Tunbridge Wells
St Bartholomew's RC Primary School, Swanley
St Botolph's CE Primary School, Northfleet
St Crispin's Infant School, Westgate-on-Sea
St Eanswythe's CE Primary School, Folkestone
St Edward's RC Primary School, Sheerness
St Ethelbert's RC Primary School, Ramsgate
St Francis' RC Primary School, Maidstone
St George's CE Foundation School, Broadstairs
St George's CE Primary School, Sheerness
St George's CE Primary School, Wrotham
St George's CE School, Gravesend
St Gregory's RC Primary School, Margate
St James' CE Primary School, Royal Tunbridge Wells
St James the Great Academy, East Malling
St John's CE Primary School, Canterbury
St John's CE Primary School, Royal Tunbridge Wells
St John's CE Primary School, Sevenoaks
St John's RC Primary School, Gravesend
St Joseph's RC Primary School, Aylesham
St Joseph's RC Primary School, Broadstairs
St Joseph's RC Primary School, Northfleet
St Katharine's CE Primary School, Knockholt
St Katherine's School, Snodland
St Laurence in Thanet CE Junior School, Ramsgate
St Lawrence CE Primary School, Seal Chart
St Luke's CofE Infant School, Tunbridge Wells
St Margaret Clitherow RC Primary School, Tonbridge
St Margaret's CE School, Marden
St Margaret's-at-Cliffe Primary School, St Margaret's at Cliffe
St Mark's CE Primary School, Eccles
St Mark's CE Primary School, Royal Tunbridge Wells
St Martin's School, Dover
St Mary of Charity CE Primary School, Faversham
St Mary's CE Primary School, Swanley
St Mary's RC Primary School, Deal
St Mary's RC Primary School, Whitstable
St Matthew's CE Primary School, High Brooms
St Michael's CE Infant School, Maidstone
St Michael's CE Primary School, St Michaels
St Mildred's Infant School, Broadstairs
St Nicholas at Wade CE Primary School, St Nicholas-at-Wade
St Nicholas CE Primary School, New Romney
St Pauls' CE Primary School, Swanley
St Paul's Infant School, Maidstone
St Peter-in-Thanet CE Junior School, Broadstairs
St Peter's CE Primary School, Aylesford
St Peter's CE Primary School, Royal Tunbridge Wells
St Peter's Methodist Primary School, Canterbury
St Peter's RC Primary School, Sittingbourne
St Richard's RC Primary School, Dover
St Saviour's CE Junior School, Westgate-on-Sea
St Simon of England C Primary school, Ashford
St Stephen's Infant School, Canterbury
St Stephen's Junior School, Canterbury
St Stephen's Primary School, Tonbridge
St Teresa's RC Primary School, Ashford
St Thomas' RC Primary School, Canterbury
St Thomas' RC Primary School, Sevenoaks
Salmestone Primary School, Margate
Saltwood CE Primary School, Saltwood
Sandgate Primary School, Folkestone
Sandhurst Primary School, Sandhurst
Sandling Primary School, Penenden Heath
Sandown Primary School, Deal
Sandwich Infant School, Sandwich
Sandwich Junior School, Sandwich
Seabrook CE Primary School, Seabrook
Seal CE Primary School, Seal
Sedley's CE Primary School, Southfleet
Sellindge Primary School, Sellindge
Selling CE Primary School, Selling
Selsted CE Primary School, Selsted
Senacre Wood Primary School, Maidstone
Sevenoaks Primary School, Sevenoaks
Shatterlocks Infant School, Dover
Shears Green Infant School, Northfleet
Shears Green Junior School, Northfleet
Sheldwich Primary School, Sheldwich
Shipbourne School, Shipbourne
Sholden CE Primary School, Sholden
Shoreham Village School, Shoreham
Shorne CE Primary School, Shorne
Sibertswold CE Primary School, Shepherdswell
Singlewell Primary School, Gravesend
Sissinghurst CE Primary School, Sissinghurst
Skinners' Kent Primary School, Royal Tunbridge Wells
Slade Primary School, Tonbridge
Smarden Primary School, Smarden
Smeeth Community Primary School, Smeeth
Snodland CE Primary School, Snodland
South Avenue Primary School, Sittingbourne
South Borough Primary School, Maidstone
Southborough CE Primary School, Southborough
Speldhurst CE Primary School, Speldhurst
Springhead Park Primary School, Northfleet
Staplehurst School, Staplehurst
Stella Maris RC Primary School, Folkestone
Stelling Minnis CE Primary School, Stelling Minnis
Stocks Green Primary School, Hildenborough
Stone St Mary's CE Primary School, Greenhithe
Stowting CE Primary School, Stowting
Sturry CE Primary School, Sturry
Sundridge and Brasted CE Primary School, Sundridge
Sunny Bank Primary School, Murston
Sussex Road Community Primary School, Tonbridge
Sutton Valence Primary School, Sutton Valence
Sutton-at-Hone CE Primary School, Sutton-at-Hone
Swalecliffe Community Primary School, Swalecliffe
Temple Ewell CE Primary School, Temple Ewell
Temple Grove Academy, Royal Tunbridge Wells
Temple Hill Primary Academy, Temple Hill
Tenterden CE Junior School, Tenterden
Tenterden Infant School, Tenterden
Teynham Parochial CE Primary School, Teynham
Thistle Hill Academy, Minster
Thurnham CE Infant School, Bearsted
Tiger Primary School, Maidstone
Tree Tops Primary Academy, Park Wood
Trottiscliffe CE Primary School, Trottiscliffe
Tunbury Primary School, Walderslade
Tunstall CE Primary School, Tunstall
Tymberwood Academy, Gravesend
Ulcombe CE Primary School, Ulcombe
Upton Junior School, Broadstairs
Vale View Community School, Dover
Valley Invicta Primary School, Aylesford
Valley Invicta Primary School, Kings Hill
Valley Invicta Primary School, Leybourne
Valley Invicta Primary School, Maidstone
Valley Invicta Primary School, Snodland
Victoria Road Primary School, Ashford
Vigo Village School, Vigo Village
Warden House Primary School, Deal
Water Meadows Primary School, Hersden
Wateringbury CE Primary School, Wateringbury
Weald Community Primary School, Sevenoaks Weald
The Wells Free School, Royal Tunbridge Wells
Wentworth Primary School, Dartford
West Borough Primary School, Maidstone
West Hill Primary Academy, Dartford
West Kingsdown CE Primary School, West Kingsdown
West Malling CE Primary School, West Malling
West Minster Primary School, Sheerness
Westcourt Primary School, Gravesend
Westgate Primary School, Dartford
Westlands Primary School, Sittingbourne
Westmeads Community Infant School, Whitstable
White Cliffs Primary School, Dover
White Oak Primary School, Swanley
Whitehill Primary School, Gravesend
Whitfield Aspen School, Whitfield
Whitstable and Seasalter CE Junior School, Whitstable
Whitstable Junior School, Whitstable
Wickhambreaux CE Primary School, Wickhambreaux
Willesborough Infant School, Willesborough
Willesborough Junior School, Willesborough
Wilmington Primary School, Wilmington
Wincheap Primary School, Canterbury
Wingham Primary School, Wingham
Wittersham CE Primary School, Wittersham
Woodchurch CE Primary School, Woodchurch
Woodlands Primary School, Tonbridge
Worth Primary School, Worth
Wouldham All Saints CE Primary School, Wouldham
Wrotham Road Primary School, Gravesend
Yalding St Peter and St Paul CE Primary School, Yalding

Non-selective secondary schools

The Abbey School, Faversham
Archbishop's School, Canterbury
Astor Secondary School, Dover
Aylesford School, Aylesford
Barton Manor School, Canterbury
Bennett Memorial Diocesan School, Tunbridge Wells
Brockhill Park Performing Arts College, Saltwood
The Canterbury Academy, Canterbury
The Charles Dickens School, Broadstairs
Cornwallis Academy, Linton
Dartford Science & Technology College, Dartford
Dover Christ Church Academy, Dover
Duke of York's Royal Military School, Guston
The Ebbsfleet Academy, Swanscombe
Folkestone Academy, Folkestone
Fulston Manor School, Sittingbourne
Goodwin Academy, Deal
Hadlow Rural Community School, Hadlow
Hartsdown Academy, Margate
Hayesbrook School, Tonbridge
Herne Bay High School, Herne Bay
Hillview School for Girls, Tonbridge
The Holmesdale School, Snodland
Homewood School, Tenterden
Hugh Christie School, Tonbridge
John Wallis Academy, Ashford
King Ethelbert School, Birchington-on-Sea
Knole Academy, Sevenoaks
Leigh Academy, Dartford
The Leigh UTC, Dartford
The Lenham School, Lenham
Longfield Academy, Longfield
The Malling School, Malling
The Maplesden Noakes School, Maidstone
The Marsh Academy, New Romney
Mascalls Academy, Paddock Wood
Meopham School, Meopham
New Line Learning Academy, Loose
The North School, Ashford
Northfleet School for Girls, Northfleet
Northfleet Technology College, Northfleet
Oasis Academy Isle of Sheppey, Isle of Sheppey
Orchards Academy, Swanley
The Royal Harbour Academy, Ramsgate
St Anselm's Catholic School, Canterbury
St Augustine Academy, Maidstone
St Edmund's Catholic School, Dover
St Georges CE Foundation School, Broadstairs
St George's Church of England School, Gravesend
St Gregory's Catholic School, Royal Tunbridge Wells
St John's Catholic Comprehensive School, Gravesend
St Simon Stock Catholic School, Maidstone
Sandwich Technology School, Sandwich
School of Science and Technology Maidstone, Maidstone
The Sittingbourne School, Sittingbourne
The Skinners' Kent Academy, Royal Tunbridge Wells
Spires Academy, Canterbury
Stone Lodge School, Stone
Thamesview School, Gravesend
The Towers School, Ashford
Trinity School, Sevenoaks
Turner Free School, Folkestone
Ursuline College, Westgate-on-Sea
Valley Park School, Maidstone
Westlands School, Sittingbourne
The Whitstable School, Whitstable
Wilmington Academy, Wilmington
Wrotham School, Wrotham
Wye School, Wye

Grammar schools

Barton Court Grammar School, Canterbury
Borden Grammar School, Sittingbourne
Chatham and Clarendon Grammar School, Ramsgate
Cranbrook School, Cranbrook
Dane Court Grammar School, Broadstairs
Dartford Grammar School, Dartford
Dartford Grammar School for Girls, Dartford
Dover Grammar School for Boys, Dover
Dover Grammar School for Girls, Dover
The Folkestone School for Girls, Folkestone
Gravesend Grammar School, Gravesend
The Harvey Grammar School, Folkestone
Highsted Grammar School, Sittingbourne
Highworth Grammar School for Girls, Ashford
Invicta Grammar School, Maidstone
The Judd School, Tonbridge
Maidstone Grammar School, Maidstone
Maidstone Grammar School for Girls, Maidstone
Mayfield Grammar School, Gravesend
The Norton Knatchbull School, Ashford
Oakwood Park Grammar School, Maidstone
Queen Elizabeth's Grammar School, Faversham
Simon Langton Girls' Grammar School, Canterbury
Simon Langton Grammar School for Boys, Canterbury
Sir Roger Manwood's School, Sandwich
The Skinners' School, Tunbridge Wells
Tonbridge Grammar School, Tonbridge
Tunbridge Wells Girls' Grammar School, Tunbridge Wells
Tunbridge Wells Grammar School for Boys, Tunbridge Wells
Weald of Kent Grammar School, Tonbridge
Wilmington Grammar School for Boys, Wilmington
Wilmington Grammar School for Girls, Wilmington

Special and alternative schools

Aspire School, Sittingbourne
The Beacon, Folkestone
Birchwood, Folkestone
Bower Grove School, Maidstone
Broomhill Bank School, Rusthall
Elms School, Dover
Enterprise Learning Alliance, Margate
Five Acre Wood School, Maidstone
Foreland Fields School, Ramsgate
Goldwyn School, Great Chart
Grange Park School, Wrotham
Ifield School, Gravesend
Laleham Gap School, Ramsgate
Maidstone and Malling Alternative Provision, Maidstone
Meadowfield School, Sittingbourne
Milestone Academy, New Ash Green
Nexus Foundation Special School, Tonbridge
North West Kent Alternative Provision Service, Gravesend
Oakley School, Royal Tunbridge Wells
The Orchard School, Canterbury
Portal House School, St Margaret's at Cliffe
The Rosewood School, Leybourne
Rowhill School, Longfield
St Anthony's School, Margate
St Nicholas' School, Canterbury
Snowfields Academy, Weavering
Stone Bay School, Broadstairs
Two Bridges School, Southborough
Valence School, Westerham
The Wyvern School, Ashford

Further education

Canterbury College
Dorton College of Further Education 
East Kent College 
Hadlow College 
K College
University for the Creative Arts
Kent Institute of Art & Design
MidKent College
North West Kent College
South Kent College

Independent schools

Primary and preparatory schools

Bronte School, Gravesend
Chartfield School, Westgate-on-Sea
Derwent Lodge, Tonbridge
Dulwich Prep Cranbrook, Coursehorn
Elliott Park School, Minster
Fosse Bank School, Hildenborough
The Granville School, Sevenoaks
Haddon Dene School, Broadstairs
Hilden Grange School, Tonbridge
Hilden Oaks Preparatory School, Tonbridge
Holmewood House School, Langton Green
Junior King's School, Sturry
Kent College Infant and Junior School, Canterbury
Lorenden Preparatory School, Faversham
Marlborough House School, Hawkhurst
The Mead School, Royal Tunbridge Wells
New Beacon School, Sevenoaks
Northbourne Park School, Betteshanger
Rose Hill School, Culverden Down
Russell House School, Otford
St Faith's at Ash School, Ash
St Helens Montessori School, East Farleigh
St Michael's Preparatory School, Otford
St Ronan's School, Hawkhurst
Sevenoaks Preparatory School, Sevenoaks
Solefield School, Sevenoaks
Somerhill Pre-Prep, Tonbridge
Spring Grove School, Wye
Steephill School, Fawkham
Wellesley House School, Broadstairs
Yardley Court, Tonbridge

Senior and all-through schools

Ashford School, Ashford
Beech Grove School, Nonington
Beechwood School, Tunbridge Wells
Benenden School, Benenden
Bethany School, Goudhurst
CATS College Canterbury, Canterbury
Cobham Hall School, Cobham
Dover College, Dover
Earlscliffe, Folkestone
Gad's Hill School, Higham
Kent College, Canterbury
Kent College, Pembury
The King's School, Canterbury
MEPA Academy, Maidstone
New School Canterbury, Petham
OneSchool Global UK, Linton
Radnor House Sevenoaks School, Sundridge
Sackville School, Hildenborough
St Edmund's School, Canterbury
St Lawrence College, Ramsgate
Sevenoaks School, Sevenoaks
Sutton Valence School, Maidstone
Tonbridge School, Tonbridge
Walthamstow Hall, Sevenoaks

Special and alternative schools

Alchemy School, Teynham
ALP Sittingbourne, Sittingbourne
The Annex School House, Hextable
Belle Vue School, Cranbrook
Birtley House Independent School, West Kingsdown
Brewood Secondary School, Deal
Caldecott Foundation School, Smeeth
Cherry Tree, Margate
Compass Community School Coastal Park, Folkestone
Cornfields School, Ashford
Cross Keys Learning, Broadstairs
The Davenport School, Eastry
Fairlight Glen Independent Special School, Herne Bay
Great Oaks Small School, Minster
Greenfields School, Biddenden
Haven Nook, Canterbury
Heath Farm School, Charing
Helen Allison School, Meopham
Hope View School, Chilham
Infiniti School, Doddington
ISP Polar Re Start Centre, Whitstable
ISP School, Teynham
King's Reach Education, Maidstone
Learning Opportunities Centre, Ringwould
Life Skills Manor for Autism, Sandwich
Lighthouse School, Cliftonville
Little Acorns School, St Michaels
The Llewellyn School and Nursery, Birchington-on-Sea
Maple Tree Primary School, Ramsgate
Meadows School, Southborough
Medway Green School, Wouldham
Newingate School, Canterbury
The Old Priory School, Ramsgate
Parkview Academy, Margate
Pier View Academy, Gravesend
The Quest School, Paddock Wood
Ripplevale School, Ripple
The Sallygate School, Temple Ewell
Small Haven School, Ramsgate
The T3 School, Ashford
The View School, Edenbridge
VTC Independent School, Sittingbourne
West Heath School, Sevenoaks

Further education
Hilderstone College, Broadstairs
MEPA College, Maidstone
School of English Studies, Folkestone

References

Kent
Schools in Kent
Lists of buildings and structures in Kent